In the Bleak Midwinter is a mystery novel written by Julia Spencer-Fleming.  Published in 2002, it won six awards for best first novel, including the Agatha Award.  The book introduced the characters of Clare Fergusson, an ex-Army helicopter pilot who has become an Episcopal priest and Russ Van Alstyne, a married police chief who lives in the same town.

References

American mystery novels
2002 American novels
Anthony Award-winning works
Macavity Award-winning works
Barry Award-winning works
Dilys Award-winning works
Agatha Award-winning works